Prisoner X is a placeholder name used by reporters for some prisoners in Israel.

 Ben Zygier was held in Ayalon Prison in Israel until his death there in 2010.
 Avri Elad (d 1993) was held in Ayalon Prison.
 Marcus Klingberg was held from 1983 to 2003 in Israel
 Mordechai Kedar, recruited by Israeli Military Intelligence in 1956
 "Prisoner X2" - an unidentified prisoner who has been held in Ayalon Prison "for many years"
 Unit 8200 Captain Tomer Eiges , died by unclear cause while in military prison awaiting trial for security offenses which were under severe court-issued gag orders and military censorship. He is said to have seriously harmed Israeli national security while acting independently from a personal motive.

In entertainment
 Age of X-Man: Prisoner X, a 2019 comic book, part of the Age of X-Man crossover
 Prisoner X, a 2014 book by Rafael Epstein
 Prisoner X, a 2015 Canadian science fiction film

References

Journalism lists
Placeholder names
Israeli culture